Rosemont is a census-designated place (CDP) in Sacramento County, California, United States. It is part of the Sacramento–Arden-Arcade–Roseville metropolitan area. The population rose to 23,510 at the 2020 census. It was 22,681 at the 2010 census, down from 22,904 at the 2000 census.

Geography
Rosemont is located at  (38.549506, -121.356211).

Demographics

2010
The 2010 United States Census reported that Rosemont had a population of 22,681. The racial makeup of Rosemont was 13,496 (59.5%) White, 2,720 (12.0%) African American, 310 (1.4%) Native American, 2,419 (10.7%) Asian, 134 (0.6%) Pacific Islander, 1,754 (7.7%) from other races, and 1,848 (8.1%) from two or more races. Hispanic or Latino of any race were 4,587 persons (20.2%).

The Census reported that 22,395 people (98.7% of the population) lived in households, 66 (0.3%) lived in non-institutionalized group quarters, and 220 (1.0%) were institutionalized.

There were 8,363 households, out of which 2,864 (34.2%) had children under the age of 18 living in them, 3,571 (42.7%) were opposite-sex married couples living together, 1,372 (16.4%) had a female householder with no husband present, 556 (6.6%) had a male householder with no wife present.  There were 640 (7.7%) unmarried opposite-sex partnerships, and 86 (1.0%) same-sex married couples or partnerships. 2,033 households (24.3%) were made up of individuals, and 584 (7.0%) had someone living alone who was 65 years of age or older. The average household size was 2.68.  There were 5,499 families (65.8% of all households); the average family size was 3.18.

The population was spread out, with 5,525 people (24.4%) under the age of 18, 2,611 people (11.5%) aged 18 to 24, 6,496 people (28.6%) aged 25 to 44, 5,798 people (25.6%) aged 45 to 64, and 2,251 people (9.9%) who were 65 years of age or older.  The median age was 33.9 years. For every 100 females, there were 96.7 males.  For every 100 females age 18 and over, there were 91.0 males.

The homeowner vacancy rate was 1.9%; the rental vacancy rate was 8.2%.  12,822 people (56.5% of the population) lived in owner-occupied housing units and 9,573 people (42.2%) lived in rental housing units.

2000
As of the census of 2000, there were 22,904 people, 8,380 households, and 5,488 families residing in the CDP. The racial makeup of the CDP was 64.49% White, 10.90% African American, 1.13% Native American, 11.17% Asian, 0.41% Pacific Islander, 5.31% from other races, and 6.59% from two or more races. Hispanic or Latino of any race were 13.20% of the population.

There were 8,380 households, out of which 32.9% had children under the age of 18 living with them, 45.9% were married couples living together, 14.1% had a female householder with no husband present, and 34.5% were non-families. 23.4% of all households were made up of individuals, and 4.8% had someone living alone who was 65 years of age or older.  The average household size was 2.66 and the average family size was 3.18.

In the CDP, the population was spread out, with 27.1% under the age of 18, 11.5% from 18 to 24, 32.6% from 25 to 44, 21.0% from 45 to 64, and 7.9% who were 65 years of age or older.  The median age was 31 years. For every 100 females, there were 96.7 males.  For every 100 females age 18 and over, there were 91.3 males.

The median income for a household in the CDP was $45,044, and the median income for a family was $48,148. Males had a median income of $36,931 versus $30,326 for females. The per capita income for the CDP was $19,467.  About 8.0% of families and 11.4% of the population were below the poverty line, including 15.2% of those under age 18 and 4.8% of those age 65 or over.

Boundaries and community
The boundaries of Rosemont are Folsom Boulevard to the north, Bradshaw Road to the east, Jackson Highway (State Route 16) to the south, and South Watt Avenue to the west. The commercial district of Rosemont, which includes retail and dining establishments, is primarily located along Kiefer Boulevard. Rosemont contains a mixture of houses dating from the 1950s to newly constructed units.

Rosemont has a voluntary Community Association–known as the Rosemont Community Association (RCA)–designed to serve as the community's advocate on local and county issues and to sponsor community events and programs.

Government

Education

There are three elementary schools in Rosemont. Golden Empire Elementary is located in the southern portion of Rosemont. Sequoia Elementary is located in the northwest portion of Rosemont, and James W. Marshall is located on the boundary of Rosemont and Lincoln Village/Rancho Cordova in the northeast portion of Rosemont. The community's only middle school Albert Einstein Middle School is located in the central portion, and is named after Albert Einstein. Rosemont High School was opened in 2003, and is located on the east side of Rosemont. The community is served by the Sacramento City Unified School District.

Transportation
Sacramento Regional Transit operates the "Gold Line" of the light rail system which runs parallel to Folsom Boulevard. The Watt/Manlove station is a transfer point to several bus lines. Other stations in the community are Starfire Station, Tiber Station and Butterfield Station. Bus 72 is the main bus that runs through the central portion of Rosemont. The main roadways are Kiefer Boulevard, South Watt Avenue, Mayhew Road, Bradshaw Road, and Folsom Boulevard. U.S. Route 50 runs through the northeastern portion of Rosemont.

Adjacent areas

Notable residents
 Alden Brock (2001-2015) - a Boy Scout who lived in Rosemont who was the sole individual to die at the 2015 Philmont Scout Ranch flash flood.
 Anthony Padilla and Ian Hecox - Internet Comedians from Smosh who filmed majority of their videos in Hecox's Rosemont home until 2016.

References

Census-designated places in Sacramento County, California
Census-designated places in California